The Okotoks Bisons are a junior "B" ice hockey team based in Okotoks, Alberta, Canada. They are members of the South Division of the Heritage Junior B Hockey League (HJHL). They play their home games at Murray Arena.

History 

Division titles won: 1996, 1997, 2003, 2004, 2005, 2006, 2007, 2011, 2012, 2013, 2014
League Championships won: 1996, 1997, 2001, 2002, 2003, 2005, 2006, 2011, 2012, 2013, 2014
Alberta Provincial entries: 1996, 1997, 2001, 2002, 2003, 2004, 2005, 2006, 2011, 2012, 2013
Alberta Provincial titles: 2013
Keystone Cup titles: none

Founded in 1985, the Bisons were originally known as the Okotoks 85ers and played in the Southern Alberta Junior Hockey League.  They moved to the Calgary Junior Hockey League in 1989 - changing to the Foothills Bisons one year later - before settling in the Heritage Junior B Hockey League (HJHL) in 1991.

The Bisons have been the most successful franchise in HJHL history, capturing ten league championships, and representing the league in the Alberta Provincials eleven times, winning in 2013 and finishing as provincial runners-up in 2001, 2002 and 2012. The Bisons have frequently battled the Blackfalds Wranglers for dominance in the HJHL.

The Bisons were at their all-time high between 2011 and 2014. They made league history by being the first team to win four consecutive league titles in the HJHL, a feat they had come close to in 2001–2003 winning three consecutively. In addition the record breaking team also won their division and advanced to the Alberta Provincial Junior B Hockey Championship in each of those four consecutive years.

In the 2012–13 season, the team won the provincials and took home the Russ Barnes Trophy, which advanced them to the Western Canadian Championships, the Keystone Cup, and took third place in the bronze medal game.

In the 2014–15 season, they ended their championship streak being knocked out early in the playoffs. They failed to take the league championship for the first time since 2010 and did not advance to provincials.

Over those four seasons, the roster included many franchise record breaking players, including Phil Dillon, Matt Howatt, and Michael Savage as the only three players who were with the Bisons for all four championship seasons. Dillon ranked first in franchise records including the most all-time goals (98) and games played (147), as well as top five in all-time points (193), assists (95), points per game (1.313), points per season (64), and assists per season (37). Howatt ranked in the top five in all-time assists (87) and games played (133).

Season-by-season record 

Note: GP = Games played, W = Wins, L = Losses, T = Ties, OTL = Overtime Losses, Pts = Points, GF = Goals for, GA = Goals against, PIM = Penalties in minutes

Russ Barnes Trophy
Alberta Jr B Provincial Championships

Awards and trophies 
HJHL Championship
1995–96, 1996–97, 2000–01, 2001–02, 2002–03, 2004–05, 2005–06, 2010–11, 2011–12, 2012–13, 2021-22

See also 
List of ice hockey teams in Alberta

References

External links 
Official website of the Okotoks Bisons

Ice hockey teams in Alberta
Okotoks